Berg Bay is a small bay between Birthday Point and Islands Point in the west side of Robertson Bay, northern Victoria Land, Antarctica. The bay was charted and named in 1911 by the Northern Party led by Victor Campbell of the British Antarctic Expedition, 1910–13, because icebergs appear to gravitate there. Haffner Glacier, which flows into this bay adjacently, may also contribute to the large amount of icebergs  or 'Bergy Bits' floating throughout the bay. Berg Bay lies situated on the Pennell Coast, a portion of Antarctica lying between Cape Williams and Cape Adare.

References
 

Bays of Victoria Land
Pennell Coast